Muhammad Fauzan bin Mohd Fauzi (born 7 January 1995) is a Malaysian footballer who plays as right-back for Malaysia Super League club Kelantan United.

Club career
Born in Seremban, Negeri Sembilan, Fauzan began his football career playing for Negeri Sembilan U21 team in 2016 at the age of 20, before been promoted to the senior team.

Career statistics

Club

International career

Fauzan was called up to the Malaysia U-23 for 2018 AFC U-23 Championship qualification in 2017.

References

External links

1995 births
Living people
Negeri Sembilan FA players
PDRM FA players
Kuala Lumpur City F.C. players
Penang F.C. players
Melaka United F.C. players
Kelantan United F.C. players
Association football fullbacks
Malaysian footballers